The Kianggeh Muslim Cemetery is a Muslim burial ground located at Kianggeh in Bandar Seri Begawan, the capital of Brunei Darussalam. The cemetery was formerly a Royal burial ground for past Sultans of Brunei. The first Sultan of Brunei buried here was Sultan Saiful Rijal, the 7th Sultan of Brunei who died in 1581.

List of graves

Sultan of Brunei's graves
 Sultan Saiful Rijal, 7th Sultan of Brunei (died: 1581).
 Sultan Shah Berunai (died: 1582).
 Sultan Haji Muhammad Ali, 12th Sultan of Brunei (died: 1661).
 Sultan Muhyiddin (died: 1690).
 Sultan Nasruddin (died: 1710).

Royal graves (members of the royal family)
 Pengiran Temenggong Abdul Rauf (died: unknown)
 Pengiran Shahbandar Mohammad Salleh Ibni Pengiran Sarmayuda, former Brunei's Governor of Sarawak (died: 1858)

 YAM Paduka Raja Bendahara Sri Indira Maharaja Pangiran Muda Muhammad Alam, grandson of Sultan Muhammad Ali ''(died: ca.1710).

References

Mausoleums in Brunei
Mausoleums